Visoko is a village and municipality in Croatia in Varaždin County. In the 2011 census, the total population of the municipality was 1,518, in the following settlements:
 Čanjevo, population 184
 Đurinovec, population 135
 Kračevec, population 135
 Presečno Visočko, population 180
 Vinično, population 277
 Visoko, population 493
 Vrh Visočki, population 114

In the 2011 census, an absolute majority of the population were Croats.

References

Municipalities of Croatia
Populated places in Varaždin County